Mikhail Niazhura (born 9 December 1980) is a Belarusian handball player for HC Gomel and the Belarusian national team.

References

1980 births
Living people
Belarusian male handball players
Sportspeople from Minsk